{{family name hatnote|Lê|Vinh (simply) or Công Vinh (politely)|Le|lang=Vietnamese}}

Lê Công Vinh (born 10 December 1985, in Nghệ An, Vietnam) is a former Vietnamese footballer. He was part of the Vietnam national team from 2004 to 2016 as an attacker. Considered one of the greatest players in Vietnamese football's history, Công Vinh achieved the highest scores of all time in the Vietnam national team, and received three Golden Ball Awards (2004, 2006, 2007).

 Early life 
Lê Công Vinh was born in Quỳnh Lâm, Quỳnh Lưu, Nghệ An; he has two older sisters and one younger sister. Due to difficult conditions for the whole family, his father smuggled cocaine; he was later arrested and sentenced to 12 years in jail. However, after only 8 years due to good behavior, he was released before the due date.

Club career

Sông Lam Nghệ An
Born in Nghệ An, Công Vinh is a well-known Vietnamese footballer. Công Vinh is widely considered the one of the best strikers that Sông Lam Nghệ An has ever produced, along with Phạm Văn Quyến. He is currently SLNA's all-time top goal scorer.

At the age of 14, he began to train his football skill. After the qualification to junior team of Nghệ An, he was classified to be "not so potential", both in skill and mentality.

At the age of 18, he was picked into the main team of Sông Lam Nghệ An where he started to show his ability at JVC Cup 2003.

Until 2004, he scored his first score at V-League on 8 February against Đồng Tháp team. Later he received Best New Player of the Year as well as Best Player of the Year Award. Eventually, he received many invitations from other football clubs, even from Japan and Saudi Arabia for the salary up to $10,000/month.

Hà Nội T&T
In 2008, after a well-documented transfer saga, Công Vinh turned down Thể Công at the last minute to accept a more lucrative offer from Hà Nội T&T; it was the highest transfer fee in Vietnamese football at the time.

Leixões S.C.
At the beginning of August 2009, T&T announced that Công Vinh would be joining Leixões Sport Club of Portugal in a three-month loan deal, starting 1 September 2009.Vietnam's Le Cong Vinh set for loan with Portugal's Leixoes; GOAL.com, 7 August 2009 The deal was facilitated by Henrique Calisto, who was once Leixões' manager.

On 24 August 2009, Công Vinh officially signed with Leixões and was given the number 29 shirt. Two days later, in a friendly match against Padroense F.C., he scored his first goal for the club, as a substitute, in the 89th minute to secure a 2–0 win. He was included in the 18-man squad for the match against defending champions F.C. Porto on 12 September, but did not make the field in an eventual 1–4 loss. His first-team debut came on 4 October, in a league contest against União de Leiria, making him the first ever Vietnamese footballer to play in a professional European league; he played the entire ninety minutes in an eventual 3–2 home win, despite trailing for most of the game.

On 18 October 2009, Công Vinh scored his first official goal for Leixões, in a 2–1 Portuguese Cup win against Casa Pia AC. In January of the following year, he returned to Hà Nội T&T.

Hà Nội FC
Le Cong Vinh made the move from T&T to its city rivals Hà Nội FC in September 2011. Công Vinh was set to sign a three-year extension with T&T but decided to move to ACB after the controversial 2011 V-League season and the set up at ACB.

Sông Lam Nghệ An
After Hà Nội FC was dissolved following the 2012 season, Công Vinh began the long process of finding a new club. After turning down trial offers from Sriwijaya of the Indonesia Super League and Consadole Sapporo of the J. League Division 2, he settled with a one-year loan move back to Sông Lam Nghệ An.

Consadole Sapporo
After failed negotiations earlier in the 2013 V.League 1 season, Le Cong Vinh announced that he would join J2 League side Consadole Sapporo on loan on 22 July 2013. His time with Consadole is scheduled to last five months from August 2013 through 1 January 2014. However, he decided to return to Vietnam one month earlier than expected because Consadole Sapporo could not advance to the play-off match. During his four months stay in Japan, he managed to score four times in 11 appearances for the club. With 2 of those goals and 9 of those appearances in the J2 League.

Becamex Bình Dương
In a game against Xi Măng Hải Phòng FC on 27 April 2015, Công Vinh set the record for the fastest goal ever scored in Vietnamese football as he put the ball in the net with barely ten seconds played. Bình Dương kicked off the match with Công Vinh latching on to a quick pass to chip the ball over goalkeeper Nguyễn Thanh Thắng in an eventual 3–1 win.

International career
In the first group match of the 2007 Asian Cup, Công Vinh scored the second goal for Vietnam to secure a 2–0 victory against United Arab Emirates. The team eventually reached the quarterfinals, before falling to eventual champions Iraq.

After a quiet and much criticised performance in the group stage in the 2008 AFF Championship, Công Vinh came through in the elimination stage. He set up the only goal in a 1–0 upset of defending champions Singapore. In the first leg of the final, Công Vinh scored the second to give Vietnam a victory against Thailand in Bangkok. In the second leg, Công Vinh set off celebrations throughout Vietnam as he headed home the tying goal in the last minute, thus giving Vietnam its first ever AFF Championship title.

After the 2016 AYA Bank Cup, Công Vinh announced that he would retire from international football after the 2016 AFF Championship. If only the Vietnamese national squad able to qualify for the finals in the 2016 edition, Công Vinh said that he will think twice about his retirement as he received request from international clubs to play in their league for the 2017 edition. Shortly after the end of Vietnam's match against Indonesia in the 2016 semi-finals, which they lost, Công Vinh retired from professional football.

International goals
Vietnam olympic

Vietnam

Playing style
Công Vinh is widely considered one of the best players in Vietnam and Southeast Asia. He is known for his exceptionally quick first step, his ideal position is shadow striker. However, he is also deployed as a left winger thanks to his pace and exceptional sprinting. In spite of his 1,72 m height, Công Vinh is well known for his aerial ability. Besides, he is also a dead-ball specialist. 

His weakness in playing style is that he cannot play well as a lone striker in tactical systems using only one forward, which was proven in AFF Cup 2012. His disappointing performance in this tournament is an example when Coach Phan Thanh Hung deployed him play as a central forward in the 4-2-3-1 formation.

After his ACL injury in 2010, Công Vinh simplized his playing style when most of his goals came from his positioning and one-touch finishing.

Additionally, Công Vinh has stated that he idolises Luís Figo and Thierry Henry. His favourite approach is to attack the box from both flanks and attempt to strike or create scoring opportunities for his teammates.

Honors
In 2009, Công Vinh ranked number five on Goal.coms Top Ten Most Promising Youngsters in Asian Football. In March 2009, he was given the Vietnamese Bronze Ball 2008, also holding the record for most goals scored in a single season by a Vietnamese player in the V-League for several seasons. By May 2010, he was the top Vietnamese goal-scorer in the league's history, also ranking second in the all-time top scorers table. On 22 March 2014, Công Vinh became the first player of the Vietnam football league to score 100 goals when Sông Lam Nghệ An F.C. won 3–1 against Hải Phòng F.C.

Personal life
Rumors surfaced in early 2009 that Công Vinh had been dating Vietnamese singer Thủy Tiên as they were spotted together on multiple occasions. During an interview before leaving Vietnam to join Leixões, Công Vinh revealed to the press that he and the singer are dating. They got engaged two years later. The couple had their first child, a daughter, on January 2, 2013.

Manager
After announcing his official retirement from professional football, Công Vinh joined Ho Chi Minh City FC as the deputy manager of the club, a role he served until May 2018.

HonoursHà NộiV.League 1: 2010
Vietnamese Super Cup: 2010Becamex Bình DươngV.League 1: 2015
Vietnamese National Cup: 2015
Vietnamese Super Cup: 2015Vietnam U23Southeast Asian Games: runner-up 2003, 2005Vietnam '''
AFF Championship: 2008

Individuals
 Vietnamese Golden Ball: 2004, 2006, 2007
 Best Young Player of Vietnam Football Federation: 2004
 Best Goal in the ASEAN Football Championship: 2014

See also
List of men's footballers with 50 or more international goals

Notes

References

External links
 
 

1985 births
Living people
People from Nghệ An province
Vietnamese footballers
Association football forwards
Primeira Liga players
Leixões S.C. players
Song Lam Nghe An FC players
V.League 1 players
Hanoi FC players
Becamex Binh Duong FC players
Vietnam international footballers
2007 AFC Asian Cup players
Expatriate footballers in Portugal
Vietnamese expatriate footballers
Vietnamese expatriate sportspeople in Portugal
J2 League players
Hokkaido Consadole Sapporo players
Expatriate footballers in Japan
Vietnamese expatriate sportspeople in Japan
Footballers at the 2006 Asian Games
Southeast Asian Games silver medalists for Vietnam
Southeast Asian Games medalists in football
Competitors at the 2003 Southeast Asian Games
Competitors at the 2005 Southeast Asian Games
Asian Games competitors for Vietnam